The 400th Tactical Missile Wing is an inactive United States Air Force unit. It was last active as the 400th Bombardment Group, a World War II Consolidated B-24 Liberator Replacement Training Unit. The unit was disbanded in 1944 in a general reorganization of Army Air Forces training units.  It was reconstituted as a missile wing in 1985, but has not been active since then.

History
The group's was activated as the 400th Bombardment Group, at Pyote Army Air Base, Texas on 1 March 1943, but made four moves before the end of the year.  it was composed of the 608th, 609th, 610th and 611th Bombardment Squadrons. It served as an Operational Training Unit (OTU) for Consolidated B-24 Liberator units until December. The OTU program involved the use of an oversized parent unit to provide cadres to "satellite groups"

In December, the group moved to Charleston Army Air Base, South Carolina, where it became a Replacement Training Unit (RTU). Like OTUs, RTUs were oversize units, however their mission was to train individual pilots and aircrews. With this mission change, the 400th Group and its components were reassigned from Second Air Force to First Air Force.

However, the Army Air Forces was finding that standard military units like the 400th, which were assigned personnel and equipment based on relatively inflexible tables of organization were not proving well adapted to the training mission.  Accordingly, it adopted a more functional system in which each base was organized into a separate numbered unit, which was manned and equipped based on the station's requirements. The 400th Group was disbanded, and along with operational and supporting units at Charleston was used to form the 113th AAF Base Unit (Bombardment (Heavy)).

The group was reconstituted in July 1985 as the 400th Tactical Missile Wing, but has not been active since.

Lineage
 Constituted as the 400th Bombardment Group (Heavy) on 15 February 1943
 Activated on 1 March 1943
 Disbanded on 10 April 1944
 Reconstituted and redesignated 400th Tactical Missile Wing on 31 July 1985

Assignments
 Second Air Force, 1 March 1943
 First Air Force, 15 December 1943 – 10 April 1944

Components
 608th Bombardment Squadron: 1 March 1943 – 10 April 1944
 609th Bombardment Squadron: 1 March 1943 – 10 April 1944
 610th Bombardment Squadron: 1 March 1943 – 10 April 1944
 611th Bombardment Squadron: 1 March 1943 – 10 April 1944

Stations

 Pyote Army Air Base, Texas, 1 March 1943
 Davis-Monthan Field, Arizona, April 1943
 Pueblo Army Air Field, Colorado, c. 2 May 1943
 Salina Army Air Field, Kansas, 31 July 1943 – 19 September 1943

 Alamogordo Army Airfield, New Mexico, 19 September 1943
 Charleston Army Air Field, South Carolina, 15 December 1943 – 10 April 1944

Aircraft
 Consolidated B-24 Liberator, 1943–1944

Awards and campaigns

References

Notes

Bibliography

 
 *

External links

Military units and formations established in 1985
Missile wings of the United States Air Force
1985 establishments in the United States